Catherine of Palma (1531–1574, born Catalina Thomás) was a Spanish nun canonised in 1930.

She was born 1 May 1531 at Valldemossa, Mallorca, Spain, in a peasant family. She worked as a servant in a household in Palma where she learned to read and embroider, before joining the Canonesses of St Augustine at the convent of St Mary Magdalene in Palma. According to legend, she was visited by devils and angels, and went into ecstasy for the last years of her life. She died 5 April 1574 at Palma, Mallorca, of natural causes.   her hat, thimble, and other relics were kept, and her body preserved in a marble sarcophagus, in the convent of St Mary Magdalene, Palma.

After her death she was celebrated locally as a saint for half a century until a decree of Pope Urban VII forbade the worship of unrecognised saints. Local people appealed to Rome and eventually she was beatified on 12 August 1792 by Pope Pius VI and canonised on 22 June 1930 by Pope Pius XI.

The house in Valldemossa where she was born, Carrer Rectoria 5, has become a shrine, and many houses in the village bear a plaque in her honour.

She is considered the patron saint of Mallorca, although other sources apply this title to Sebastian, Alphonsus Rodriguez or the Virgen de Lluc of the Santuari de Lluc.

She is commemorated on 1 April, and on 27 and 28 July in her home town of Valldemossa.

Spellings of her names found in sources include Catalina, Caterina, Cathalina and Catherine, and Thomas, Thomás, Tomas, Tomàs Gallard, and Tomàs i Gallard.

References

1533 births
1574 deaths
16th-century Spanish nuns
Christian female saints of the Early Modern era
Spanish Roman Catholic saints
People from Valldemosa
Beatifications by Pope Pius VI
Venerated Catholics